is a Japanese voice actress and singer.

Notable filmography 
 Kimie Sugawara in Otome wa Boku ni Koishiteru
 Yuuna Akashi in Negima!
 Miki Tachibana in Night Head Genesis
 Sana Hidaka (childhood) in Myself ; Yourself
 Singing voice of Latias in Pokémon Heroes

External links 
 Picture- https://web.archive.org/web/20071008055836/http://pro-baobab.jp/ladies/kimura_m/index.html
 

Kimura Madoka
Living people
1980 births